The 2009 season was Helsingin Jalkapalloklubi's 79th competitive season, 29th consecutive season in the Veikkausliiga, and 102nd year in existence as a football club.

The 2009 season would see HJK claim a 22nd Veikkausliiga title.

Competitions

Veikkausliiga

Results summary

Results by round

Results

League table

Finnish Cup

League Cup

Group 2

Knockout stages

UEFA Europa League

Qualifying phase

References

2009
Helsingin Jalkapalloklubi